The 2018 Liga 1 U-19 season was the eight edition of the Indonesia Junior Level League system since its introduction in 2008, the second and last since being changed from an under-21 league to under-19. From 2019, the league will competed by the under-20 teams. This season's participants were the U-19 teams of 2018 Liga 1 teams. The season began on 29 September 2018 and ended on 26 November 2018.

Persipura U19s were the defending champions after defeating Persib U19s 1–0 in last year final.

Persib U19s won the title on 26 November 2018 after defeating Persija U19s 1–0 in the final.

Overview

Format
The format of this competition was the same as before, divided into four acts consist of two group rounds and two knockout rounds, which was the semifinals and final. On the first round, the teams were divided into three groups each containing six clubs, the top two teams of each group and the two best third place advanced to the second round. The difference in this round was that all groups held a home tournament. The second round consists of two groups containing four teams in each group, the best team from each group and the best runner-up advanced to the semi-finals. The winner of the semi-finals advanced to the final to battle for the championship.

Regulations
Player registration regulations were as follows:
 Teams could register a maximum of 30 players;
 Players born on or after 1 January 1999 were eligible to compete in the tournament.
 Each team was allowed to register five players born on 1 January – 31 December 1998 who must had been registered in 2017 Liga 1 U-19.

First round 
First round was the group stage and started on 29 September 2018. All groups play double-game round-robin home tournament. The winners and runner-ups from each group along with two best third-placed teams advance to second round.

Group A
PSMS U19s hosted the first half at Teladan Stadium. While Sriwijaya U19s hosted the second half at Athletic Stadium.

Group B
Bali United U19s hosted the first half at Kapten I Wayan Dipta Stadium. While Persib U19s hosted the second half at Arcamanik Stadium and Siliwangi Stadium.

Group C
Arema U19s hosted the first half at Gajayana Stadium. While the second half were played in Moch. Soebroto Stadium and Gemilang Stadium, Magelang.

Ranking of third-placed teams

Second round
Second round was the group stage and was played on 7–11 November 2018. All groups was played on a single-game round-robin home tournament. The winners and runner-ups from each group advance to semi-finals. The draw for the group was held on 31 October 2018.

Group 1
This group was played at Moch. Soebroto Stadium and Gemilang Stadium, Magelang.

|}

Group 2
This group was played at May 17th Stadium, Banjarmasin and Demang Lehman Stadium, Martapura.

|}

Knockout round

Bracket

Semi-finals

|}

Third Place

|}

Final

|}

Top goalscorers

See also
 2018 Liga 1
 2018 Liga 2
 2018 Liga 3
 2018–19 Piala Indonesia

References

Liga 1 U-19
Liga 1 U-19
2018 in Indonesian sport